Feast of the Gods or Banquet of the Gods may refer to: 

Feast of the Gods (art), a subject in Western art
The Feast of the Gods, a painting by Giovanni Bellini and Titian
Feast of the Gods (TV series), a 2012 South Korean television series

See also
Theoxenia, an Ancient Greek concept of hospitality to and among the gods